Spatial computing was defined in 2003 by Simon Greenwold, as "human interaction with a machine in which the machine retains and manipulates referents to real objects and spaces".

It has also been coined in 2007 during the 0631 Dagstuhl workshop by André DeHon, Jean-Louis Giavitto and Frédéric Gruau for a field of research in computer science where space is not an abstract notion but a first-order effect that has to be optimized. The Spatial Computing web site gathers some work done on that subject. 

With the advent of consumer virtual reality, augmented reality, and mixed reality, companies such as Microsoft and Magic Leap  use "spatial computing" in reference to the practice of using physical actions (head and body movements, gestures, speech) as inputs for interactive digital media systems, with perceived 3D physical space as the canvas for video, audio, and haptic outputs. It is also tied to the concept of 'digital twins'.

References

Computer science